This is a list of the top 50 singles of 1977 in New Zealand.

Chart
Key
 – Single of New Zealand origin

References

Top 40 singles
1977 record charts
Singles 1977
1970s in New Zealand music